Levon Chorbajian (born 1942) is an American sociologist. He is a professor at the University of Massachusetts Lowell. He is the Director of the US section of the Zoryan Institute for Contemporary Armenian Research and Documentation.

An Armenian American, Chorbajian is involved in socialist and progressive politics and is a critic of neoliberalism.

Bibliography
Author

Editor

Translator

References

1942 births
American sociologists
American socialists
Armenian socialists
American people of Armenian descent
Living people
Massachusetts socialists